Killing Time (Temps mort) is a 2007 Canadian documentary film that tells the story of how Bhutan expelled a sixth of its population in 1990.  It was produced and directed by Annika Gustafson.

Awards
The film won le Grand Prix at the Montreal Human Rights Film Festival 2008.

External links
 Official web site

References

20th century in Bhutan
Documentary films about historical events
2007 films
Canadian documentary films
Films set in Bhutan
Documentary films about refugees
2000s Canadian films